The 1971 Monte Carlo Open was a combined men's and women's tennis tournament played on outdoor clay courts at the Monte Carlo Country Club in Roquebrune-Cap-Martin, France. The men's tournament was part of the 1971 Pepsi-Cola Grand Prix circuit. It was the 65th edition of the event and was held from 12 April through 17 April 1971. Ilie Năstase and Gail Chanfreau won the singles titles.

Finals

Men's singles

 Ilie Năstase defeated  Tom Okker 3–6, 8–6, 6–1, 6–1

Women's singles
 Gail Chanfreau defeated  Betty Stöve 6–4, 4–6, 6–4

Men's doubles

 Ilie Năstase /  Ion Țiriac defeated  Tom Okker /  Roger Taylor  1–6, 6–3, 6–3, 8–6

Women's doubles
 Katja Ebbinghaus /  Betty Stöve defeated  Lucia Bassi /  Lea Pericoli  6–4, 6–3

References

External links
 
 ATP tournament profile
 ITF tournament edition details

Monte Carlo Open
Monte-Carlo Masters
Monte Carlo Open
Monte Carlo Open
Monte
Monte Carlo Open